Mycalesis (annamitica) lepcha, the Lepcha bushbrown, is a satyrine butterfly found in Asia. It is not resolved whether it is best considered a distinct species, or included in Mycalesis annamitica. It was formerly included in Mycalesis malsara.

Description
Wet-season form. Upperside very dark Vandyke brown; cilia whitish brown; the discal transverse white bar on the underside of the wings showing through very clearly, more distinctly on the forewing than on the hindwing; followed on both wings by two or three dark pale-ringed, generally non-pupilled ocelli, and subterminal and terminal pale slender lines. Underside: ground colour darker, the discal white bar and terminal slender line as on the upperside, but the former clear and well-defined inwardly, diffuse outwardly; forewing with four, hindwing with seven white-centred, fulvous-ringed, black ocelli; the rows of ocelli bordered on both sides by narrow crescentic pale purpurescent (purplish) marks forming somewhat irregular lines; subterminal line similar, lunular. Antennae, head, thorax and abdomen brown; club of the antennae ochraceous, marked with black on the inner side. Male sex-mark in form 2.

Dry-season form. Upperside similar but paler; the ocelli, especially on the hindwing, obscure or absent; the transverse white discal band on the wings seen by transmission from the underside narrow and very obscure. Underside: basal areas of wings up to the discal white band dark brown in the male, ochraceous brown in the female; the discal white band very narrow and ochraceous white; the terminal margins beyond purpurescent; ocelli minute; both forewings and hindwings irrorated with short, transverse, brown striae.

References

Mycalesis
Fauna of Pakistan
Butterflies of Asia
Butterflies of Indochina
Butterflies described in 1880
Taxa named by Frederic Moore